Laurence Arribagé (25 May 1970) is a French politician and communications advisor.
She is a member of the Union for a Popular Movement party. She served as member of Parliament from 2014 to 2017. She is deputy mayor of Toulouse since 2014. She was also elected regional councilor of Midi-Pyrénées from 2010 to 2014. She was departmental secretary of the UMP federation then Les Républicains de la Haute-Garonne from 2011 to 2016.

Biography
Laurence Arribagé was born in Albi, France in 1970. She is married to Dominique Arribagé and has children. She studied at Toulouse 1 University Capitole. For the 2017 legislative elections, she was standing in the third constituency of Haute-Garonne. She is a member of the national assembly's committee on cultural affairs and education.
She was elected MP on June 1, 2014, Jean-Luc Moudenc becoming his deputy.

References 

1970 births
Living people
People from Albi
Union for a Popular Movement politicians
20th-century French women politicians
21st-century French women politicians
University of Toulouse alumni